Tom Geredine (born June 17, 1950) is a former American football wide receiver. He played for the Atlanta Falcons from 1973 to 1974 and for the Los Angeles Rams in 1976.

References

1950 births
Living people
American football wide receivers
Truman Bulldogs football players
Atlanta Falcons players
Los Angeles Rams players